Edward Thomas Brady (born November 1, 1943) is an American trial attorney and former associate justice of the North Carolina Supreme Court. He was elected in November 2002 as a Republican, defeating incumbent G. K. Butterfield. His term expired in January 2011 and he did not seek re-election in 2010. He was the last serving North Carolina Supreme Court justice to be elected in a partisan race. All judicial races in North Carolina became non-partisan as the result of the Judicial Campaign Reform Act signed into law by Governor Mike Easley on October 8, 2002.

Early life and education
Born in Brooklyn, Brady enlisted in the United States Army in 1965 as a private and was decorated for his service in the Vietnam War. Brady then served as a special agent with the Bureau of Alcohol, Tobacco and Firearms, assigned to Milwaukee. Brady earned a Bachelor of Science degree in criminal justice from the University of Nebraska Omaha. In 1977, he earned a Master of Science in criminal justice from the John Jay College of Criminal Justice. He also earned a J.D. degree from the California Western School of Law and was awarded the Dean's Award. Justice Brady is a member of the state bar of Georgia, the North Carolina state bar, and the District of Columbia bar.

Career

Brady retired from the United States Army Reserve as a colonel (O-6) in 1993, having held military police, special operations, aviation command, and staff assignments. In 1968, while on active duty, Justice Brady was awarded the Distinguished Flying Cross, Bronze Star Medal, Air Medal with Valor Device for heroism and 2nd-18th Oak Leaf Cluster, Army Commendation Medal with Valor Device for heroism and the Vietnam Cross of Gallantry with Bronze Star. In 1966, he graduated from Infantry Officer Candidate School and earned the Parachutist Badge, Pathfinder Badge, Special Forces Tab, and was subsequently awarded the Senior Army Aviation Badge.

Legal career
Upon graduating law school in 1978, Justice Brady began in private practice in Fayetteville, North Carolina. He continued with the private Law firm of Brady and Brady until 2003, when he took office as an associate justice for the North Carolina Supreme Court. Since retiring from the Supreme Court of North Carolina, he has joined the Brady Law Firm. His area of practice is criminal defense.

For two decades, Justice Brady's area of practice was litigation in both state and federal courts in Eastern North Carolina. As a citizen-soldier, Justice Brady represented members of the armed forces in both administrative matters and general courts-martial under the Uniform Code of Military Justice. In 2002, the people of the "Old North State" elected Justice Brady to serve as an associate justice on their State's highest court.

He is additionally admitted to practice in the United States Supreme Court, the United States Court of Appeals for the Fourth Circuit, the United States Court of Appeals for the District of Columbia Circuit, the United States Army Court of Military Appeals for Armed Forces, and the United States Army Court of Criminal Appeals.

Personal life

Brady is a Southern Baptist. He and his family are members of Village Baptist Church in Fayetteville, North Carolina, where Brady also served as a member of the personnel committee.

References

Living people
Justices of the North Carolina Supreme Court
Recipients of the Distinguished Flying Cross (United States)
United States Army colonels
ATF agents
United States Army personnel of the Vietnam War
1943 births